Sibiry Keita (born 30 January 2001) is a Malian professional footballer who plays as a midfielder for the Belgian Pro League club Eupen.

Professional career
Keita joined the Aspire Academy in 2014, where he was one of the 3 players out of a pool of 35,200 players who tried out to join. On 31 January 2019, Keita signed a 3 year contract with Eupen. Keita made his professional debut with Eupen in a 1-0 Belgian First Division A loss to K.V.C. Westerlo on 27 April 2019.

International career
Keita represented the Mali U17 for 2017 Africa U-17 Cup of Nations qualification.

References

External links
 
 AS Eupen Profile

2001 births
Living people
Malian footballers
Mali youth international footballers
K.A.S. Eupen players
Aspire Academy (Senegal) players
Belgian Pro League players
Association football midfielders
Malian expatriate footballers
Expatriate footballers in Belgium
21st-century Malian people
Malian expatriate sportspeople in Belgium